The 2020 European Wrestling Championships was held in Rome, Italy between 10 and 16 February 2020.

Medal table

Team ranking

Medal summary

Men's freestyle

Men's Greco-Roman

Women's freestyle

References

External links
Official website
Results book

 
Europe
European Wrestling Championships
International wrestling competitions hosted by Italy
Sports competitions in Rome
European Wrestling Championships
Wrestling Championships
European Wrestling Championships